= Halbbruder =

Halbbruder can be:

- The German translation of half brother; see wikt:Halbbruder
- A rank in the Teutonic Knights
